The Michigan State Fair is an annual event originally held from 1849 to 2009 in Detroit, the state's largest city. In 2009 the governor declined to fund it because of other priorities.

Because agriculture still has a major place in the Michigan economy, in 2011 supporters organized the Great Lakes Agricultural Fair, a 501 C (3) organization, in order to continue the event. Since 2013 it has been organized by the private Michigan State Fair LLC and held in the Suburban Collection Showplace in the Metro Detroit suburb of Novi.

History

The first official Michigan State Fair was held in 1849 in Detroit, Michigan. The first state fair had been held on October 1, 1839 in Ann Arbor, Michigan. It was moved to Detroit in 1849. The state had claimed that this was the oldest state fair in the United States, but the first such fair was held September 29–30, 1841 in Syracuse, New York. Subsequent Michigan state fairs were held in other cities until 1905, when it received what was its permanent home for decades at the Michigan State Fairgrounds in Detroit.

In 1904, Joseph L. Hudson, together with three of his associates, organized to acquire a site for the fair. They formed the State Fair Land Company, which acquired  between 7½ and 8 Mile roads, east of Woodward Avenue. Having no interest in running the fair, Hudson sold the land to the Michigan State Agricultural Society for one dollar ($29.00 in today's money) on April 18, 1905. Throughout the following years, additional land was purchased and sold.

Michigan State Fairgrounds Coliseum, also known as the Hockeytown State Fair Coliseum, was a 5,600-seat multi-purpose arena located on the fairgrounds. In 1899 a one-mile track was constructed at the fairgrounds and originally used for Thoroughbred flat racing and Standardbred harness racing. In the mid-20th century, two NASCAR races were held on this track. Tommy Thompson won the 1951 event and Tim Flock won in 1952.

On October 30, 2009, Governor Jennifer Granholm vetoed legislation to provide funding to the Michigan State Fair.

Attendance had peaked at 1.2 million in 1966. In 2009 fair attendance had declined to 217,000 visitors. The state fair was not held in the following two years.

On April 9, 2012, Governor Rick Snyder signed Senate Bill 515 and House Bill 4803, which would authorize the transfer of the fairgrounds land to the Land Bank Fast Track Authority, which would oversee the land for future development, including plans for a station for the proposed commuter rail service.

As the agricultural industry is Michigan's second leading economic industry, many people were disturbed by the failure of the state to support a state fair. They organized Great Lakes Agricultural Fair, a 501 C (3) organization, in 2011 to ensure such events continued.

The Great Lakes State Fair took place August 31 through September 3, 2012, at the Suburban Collection Showplace in the Detroit suburb of Novi.

In 2013, Fifth Third Bank became the name sponsor, so the event was called the Fifth Third Bank Michigan State Fair, again held in Novi at the Suburban Collection Showplace. Organizing the fair was taken over by Michigan State Fair LLC.

Seven years later, a virtual fair was held as live shows & other events were cancelled due to the COVID-19 pandemic.

See also

 Upper Peninsula State Fair
 Michigan State Fairgrounds Coliseum
 Michigan State Fairgrounds Speedway
 Michigan State Fair Riding Coliseum, Dairy Cattle Building, and Agricultural Building

References

Further reading
 Sonoras, Steven. "Michigan State Fair combines new and traditional" (Archive). The Detroit News. September 3, 2015.

External links
 Michigan State Fair LLC official site

History of Detroit
State fairs
Festivals in Detroit
NASCAR tracks
Recurring events disestablished in 2009
Festivals established in 1849
1849 establishments in Michigan